Aislaby may refer to:

 Aislaby, County Durham, in the borough of Stockton-on-Tees and ceremonial county of County Durham
 Aislaby, Ryedale, near Pickering, Ryedale, North Yorkshire
 Aislaby, Scarborough, near Whitby in Scarborough district, North Yorkshire